Daan Manneke (born 7 November 1939) is a Dutch composer and organist.

Manneke was born in Kruiningen. He studied organ and composition from 1963 to 1967 at the Brabant Conservatory in Tilburg, under H. Houët and Louis Toebosch (organ) and Jan van Dijk (composition) then studied organ with Belgian organist Kamiel d’Hooghe in Brussels, followed by composition with Ton de Leeuw in Amsterdam. In 1976 he was awarded The Composition Prize at the Amsterdam Sweelinck Conservatory, where he now teaches composition and analysis of 20th-century music. He was conductor of Cappella Breda, and has made numerous recordings with them (Dufay, Willaert, Bruckner, Strawinsky, Pärt, Ton de Leeuw, Manneke).

Works
He has written over 90 works in various styles, and is particularly known for his organ and choral music.

Selected recordings
works on Invisible Cities Quink Vocal Ensemble, Telarc 1996

References

biography at Muziek Centrum Nederland
Profile

External links
Official website

1939 births
Living people
21st-century male musicians
21st-century organists
Academic staff of the Conservatorium van Amsterdam
Composers for carillon
Dutch composers
Dutch organists
Male organists
People from Reimerswaal